Wilfrid Denys Pawson (26 November 1905 – 24 December 1959) was Archdeacon of Lindisfarne  from 1956 until his death.

Pawson was educated at Osborne, Dartmouth, and Jesus College, Cambridge. After a curacy at St Mary's, Barnsley he held incumbencies in  Dodworth, Heckmondwike, Brighouse, Broughty Ferry and Eglingham.

References

Archdeacons of Lindisfarne
Alumni of New College, Oxford
People educated at the Royal Naval College, Osborne
1905 births
1959 deaths